Tessaratoma papillosa, the lychee giant stink bug, is a species of bug in the family Tessaratomidae. It is found in Indomalaya, Australasia, and Eastern Asia.

References

External links

 

Tessaratomidae
Insects described in 1770
Taxa named by Dru Drury